Julianne Vanden Wyngaard is a professional carillonist and pianist residing in Grand Rapids, Michigan, who served as vice president of The Guild of Carillonneurs in North America (GCNA), as well as president from 2017-2019. In a predominantly male and white field, Vanden Wyngaard has distinguished herself through musical and professional accolades.

Education
As an undergraduate, Vanden Wyngaard studied piano at the Eastman School of Music. She continued to receive her BFA at the University of Wisconsin–Milwaukee and then participated in graduate work at Michigan State University. Most recently in 2000, Vanden Wyngaard received a diploma from the Netherlands Carillon School.

Professional
In 1965 Vanden Wyngaard joined the Grand Valley State University (GVSU) faculty where she was featured as a piano soloist and professor. Vanden Wyngaard was vital in the creation of the carillon program at GVSU, which now has two of the fourteen carillon towers in Michigan. When asked about her career, Vanden Wyngaard stated, "My biggest accomplishment was bringing the carillon to the west Michigan community."

References

African-American pianists
Carillonneurs
Living people
American keyboardists
20th-century American women musicians
20th-century American musicians
20th-century classical musicians
Musicians from Michigan
21st-century American women musicians
21st-century American musicians
Year of birth missing (living people)
21st-century classical musicians
Eastman School of Music alumni
University of Wisconsin–Milwaukee alumni
Michigan State University alumni
Grand Valley State University faculty
Academics from Michigan
American women classical pianists
American classical pianists
American women academics
African-American women musicians
20th-century African-American women
21st-century African-American women
21st-century African-American musicians